Demulsifiers, or emulsion breakers, are a class of specialty chemicals used to separate emulsions, for example, water in oil. They are commonly used in the processing of crude oil, which is typically produced along with significant quantities of saline water. This water  (and salt) must be removed from the crude oil prior to refining. If the majority of the water and salt are not removed, significant corrosion problems can occur in the refining process.

Demulsifiers are typically based on the following chemistry:
 Acid catalysed phenol-formaldehyde resins
 Base catalysed phenol-formaldehyde resins
 Epoxy resins
 Polyethyleneimines
 Polyamines
 Di-epoxides
 Polyols
 dendrimer

The above are usually ethoxylated (and/or propoxylated) to provide the desired degree of water/oil solubility.
The addition of ethylene oxide increases water solubility, propylene oxide decreases it.

Commercially available demulsifier formulations are typically a mixture of two to four different chemistries, in carrier solvent(s) such as xylene, heavy aromatic naphtha (HAN), Isopropanol, methanol, 2-Ethylhexanol or diesel.

Demulsifiers are manufactured by chemical manufacturers including:
 Arkema
 Baker Hughes
 BASF
 ChampionX
 Clariant
 Dow Chemical Company
 Lubrizol
 Nouryon
 PureChem Services (CES)
 SI Group
 Solvay
 Stepan
 Starborn Chemical

References

Chemical mixtures